The Range Rover (L405) is a mid-size to full-size luxury 4x4 / sport utility vehicle, made under the Land Rover brand by Jaguar Land Rover. It is the fourth generation of the original, main Range Rover series. It uses an all-aluminium monocoque unitary body structure, instead of the third generation's steel unibody — making it the first production 4x4 to do so, resulting in a weight reduction of  compared to its predecessor.

Range Rover (2012–2021)

The vehicle was unveiled at the 2012 Paris Motor Show. Sales of Range Rover began in late 2012 as 2013 models.

Early models include a choice of two petrol (5.0-litre 375 PS LR-V8 and 510PS LR-V8 Supercharged) and two diesel (3.0-litre 258PS TDV6 and 4.4-litre 339PS SDV8) engines, all with an eight-speed automatic transmission.

Japan models went on sale in January 2013. Early models include 5.0 V8 Vogue (375PS), 5.0 V8 Supercharged Vogue (510PS), Autobiography (510PS), and SVAutobiography Dynamic (550PS).

Specifications
The 4th generation (L405) Range Rover again uses a unitary monocoque body-shell, but contrary to the previous model, it is made from all-aluminium rather than steel, including unique high-strength alloy, up to 50% recycled aluminium; and production takes place in an all new aluminium facility at Land Rover's Solihull site.

The all-aluminium monocoque body structure is a first for a 4x4 SUV platform, according to Land Rover, resulting in a remarkable 39 percent lighter body-shell, and a reduction of  compared to its predecessor. The Range Rover has a new version of Terrain Response, dubbed Terrain Response2.

Powertrain
The Range Rover has two diesel engines options and three petrol engines;
 5.0 L V8 petrol engine unit with two versions
 A 2.0 L I4 Ingenium petrol Plug-in Hybrid engine available for the 2019 Land Rover Range Rover P400e.

All engines use an eight-speed automatic transmission. Gears are selected from the Drive Select rotary shifter on the centre console or the driver can also manually select gears via the paddle shift controls on the steering wheel.

The car has permanent four-wheel drive with 50/50 torque split and a two-speed transfer case for high and low range options.

Suspension
The Range Rover has electronic cross-linked air suspension with variable ride height. Multiple suspension modes are provided as standard, including: access, normal on-road, off-road and extended height. The car has an automated load leveling mechanism.

Adaptive dynamics continuously analyse vehicle movements over 500 times per second, reacting instantaneously to road conditions and driver actions. Variable dampers adjust to maintain a composed and balanced ride. The dynamic response system independently adjusts and monitors front and rear suspension units, reducing the amount of body roll during cornering, as well as enhancing control and stability at higher speeds.

Terrain Response
The Range Rover's all-terrain capability features a new second generation Terrain Response system. The system monitors ground conditions to determine the most appropriate response to the terrain and automatically optimises vehicle settings. The system provides settings for grass, gravel, snow, mud, sand, and rock crawl, Terrain Response technology instantly reconfigures transmission, suspension, and traction settings. Controlled Acceleration Control prevents excessive speeds downhill, and Hill Start Assist prevents the vehicle from inadvertently rolling backwards.

Safety
The Range Rover has driver and passenger airbags (side, seat-front, thorax and pelvis), plus airbags to protect rear-seat passengers.
Other safety aids include cornering brake control, which helps to maintain stability when cornering by adjusting the driver's generated brake pressure, along with dynamic stability control to maintain control by reducing engine torque and applying braking to the appropriate wheel and correcting understeer or oversteer.

Range Rover Long-Wheelbase, Autobiography Black (2014–present)
The vehicles were unveiled at the 2013 Los Angeles Auto Show. Deliveries of long-wheelbase Range Rover models were set to begin in late Q1 2014.

The Range Rover Long-Wheelbase Autobiography Black is a limited version of the 2014 Range Rover Long-Wheelbase for the US market, with the first 25 units in Valloire White pearlescent body colour.

Changes include front grille and side vents and badging in black enamel and chrome, signature rear lamps, a chrome accent finish to the tailgate and auxiliary vents to the front and new exclusive 7-spoke 21-inch wheels with a high gloss polished finish.

More changes are individualized front and rear seating package, bespoke seat cover design, adjustable 18-way front seat, two individual fully adjustable rear seats, new rear center console (electrically deployable tables covered in black leather), 10.2-inch rear seat entertainment screens, tread plates with an illuminated 'Autobiography Black' script, a choice of 3 interior colour schemes (Ebony/Lunar, Espresso/Tan, Dark Cherry/Ivory).

Early models included Supercharged and Autobiography trim levels with either a three-across bench seat or individual rear seats with a center console.

Range Rover SV Coupe (Cancelled)
In 2018, Land Rover unveiled the limited edition Range Rover SV Coupe at the 2018 Geneva Auto Show. The variant would seat four passengers and be the fastest Range Rover ever built. The vehicle was expected to go on sale in 2020 with availability limited to 999 units. However, in January 2019, Land Rover announced that Range Rover SV Coupe had been cancelled due to financial constraints and the vehicle containing many expensive, unique parts that were incompatible with other Range Rover variants. Land Rover notified all customers that placed orders and reservations that development had been cancelled. Land Rover stated that funding and investments towards development for the cancelled vehicle would instead be spent on developing electric crossovers and SUVs, as part of efforts to return to profitability.

Gallery

References

External links

 Official USA website

Land Rover vehicles
Cars introduced in 2012
2020s cars
Full-size sport utility vehicles
Luxury sport utility vehicles
All-wheel-drive vehicles
Euro NCAP large off-road
Flagship vehicles
Plug-in hybrid vehicles